Timber Toppers is a 1938 American short film by 20th Century Fox. In 1939, it was nominated for an Academy Award for Best Live Action Short Film, One-Reel at the 11th Academy Awards.

References

External links

1938 films
1938 short films
20th Century Fox short films
American black-and-white films
1930s English-language films